Henry George Hand (17 September 1810 – 12 August 1887) was an English cricketer with amateur status. He was associated with Cambridge University and made his first-class debut in 1828.

Hand was educated at Eton College and King's College, Cambridge. He was a fellow of King's 1831–51 including a period as vice-provost (deputy head of the college). During this time he was ordained as a Church of England priest; he was rector of Hepworth, Suffolk, 1851–83.

References

1810 births
1887 deaths
English cricketers
English cricketers of 1826 to 1863
Cambridge University cricketers
Gentlemen cricketers
Marylebone Cricket Club cricketers
People educated at Eton College
Alumni of King's College, Cambridge
Fellows of King's College, Cambridge
19th-century English Anglican priests
Cambridge Town Club cricketers
Fast v Slow cricketers